De patitas a la calle is a 2020 Peruvian fantasy comedy film directed by Carlos Landeo and written by Adrián Ochoa. It is the first Peruvian production where the protagonists are talking animals. It premiered on November 27, 2020, in Peruvian theaters.

Synopsis 
It tells the story of an adorable brigade of pets made up of dogs, a cat, a parrot, and a goat. They will have a very important mission: return home; However, along the way they will encounter human cruelty, which sees in them a method of profit.

Cast 
The actors participating in this film are:

 Nicolás Fantinato as Toto
 Nico Argelo as Aron
 Pold Gastello as General
 Titi Plaza as Lazmi
 Jean Rivera Jurado as The one who carries the dog
 Pietro Sibille
 Junior Silva
 Stephanie Orúe
 Nico Ames
 Carlos Casella
 Airam Galliani

Reception 
De patitas a la calle attracted 26,952 people throughout its run in Peruvian theaters.

References

External links 

 

2020 films
2020 fantasy films
2020 comedy films
Peruvian fantasy comedy films
Star Films films
2020s Spanish-language films
2020s Peruvian films
Films set in Peru
Films shot in Peru
Films about dogs
Talking dog films